Mack G. Shirley (born July 24, 1933 in Rexburg, Idaho) was a Republican Idaho State Representative from 2002-2012 representing District 34 in the A seat.

Education and career
Shirley graduated from Sugar-Salem High School in 1951 and earned his bachelor's degree in sociology from Ricks College in 1955. Shirley earned his master's degree in education administration from the University of Utah in 1957. He served in the United States Army Reserve.

From 1957-1963, Shirley was a teacher and then a principal in the Sugar-Salem School District. He returned to the University of Utah and completed his Ph.D. in higher education administration there in 1972. He then was a faculty member, dean of students, and vice president of Ricks College until his retirement in 2000.

Elections

References

External links
Mack G. Shirley at the Idaho Legislature

1933 births
Living people
American Latter Day Saints
Schoolteachers from Idaho
Brigham Young University–Idaho alumni
Brigham Young University–Idaho faculty
Republican Party members of the Idaho House of Representatives
People from Rexburg, Idaho
University of Utah alumni
United States Army soldiers
United States Army reservists